is a passenger railway station in located in the city of Fujiidera,  Osaka Prefecture, Japan, operated by the private railway operator Kintetsu Railway.

Lines
Hajinosato Station is served by the Minami Osaka Line, and is located 15.6 rail kilometers from the starting point of the line at Ōsaka Abenobashi Station.

Station layout
The station consists of two opposed side platforms set in a cutting connected by an elevated station building.

Platforms

Adjacent stations

History
Hajinosato Station opened on June 1, 1924.

Passenger statistics
In fiscal 2018, the station was used by an average of 7,284 passengers daily.

Surrounding area
Furuichi Kofun Cluster
Fujiidera City Domyoji Elementary School
Fujiidera City Domyoji Junior High Schoo

See also
List of railway stations in Japan

References

External links

 Hajinosato Station 

Railway stations in Japan opened in 1924
Railway stations in Osaka Prefecture
Fujiidera